Darnell Nunatak is a prominent nunatak,  high, standing  northwest of Mount Rummage in the southwestern part of the Britannia Range. It was named by the Advisory Committee on Antarctic Names for Chief Aviation Machinist's Mate Shepard L. Darnell, a member of U.S. Navy Squadron VX-6. During the period 27 December 1962 – 4 January 1963, Chief Darnell and six mechanics replaced in the field the engine of a helicopter downed on Emmanuel Glacier.

Further reading 
 Carosi, R., F. Giacomini, F. Talarico, and E. Stump, Geology of the Byrd Glacier Discontinuity (Ross Orogen): New survey data from the Britannia Range, Antarctica, (2007). Related Publications from ANDRILL Affiliates. 19, PP 3,5

References 

Nunataks of Oates Land